Happy New Year '49 is a 1986 Yugoslavian Macedonian-language drama film directed by Stole Popov, starring Svetozar Cvetković, Meto Jovanovski, Vladislava Milosavljević and Aco Đorčev. It was Yugoslavia's submission to the 59th Academy Awards for the Academy Award for Best Foreign Language Film, but it failed to make the nominees shortlist.

See also
 List of submissions to the 59th Academy Awards for Best Foreign Language Film
 List of Yugoslav submissions for the Academy Award for Best Foreign Language Film

References

External links 
 
 ''Srećna nova '49. at the Macedonian Cinema Information Center

1986 films
1986 drama films
Macedonian-language films
Serbo-Croatian-language films
Yugoslav drama films
Films set in Yugoslavia
Macedonian drama films